Eupithecia limbata is a moth in the  family Geometridae. It is found in Italy, France, Slovenia, North Macedonia, Greece and Bulgaria. It is also found in Iran.

The larvae feed on Eryngium amethystinum.

Subspecies
Eupithecia limbata limbata
Eupithecia limbata tomillata (Chretien, 1904)

References

Moths described in 1879
limbata
Moths of Europe
Moths of Asia